Frederick Frelinghuysen may refer to the following, all members of the American Frelinghuysen political family:

 Frederick Frelinghuysen (general) (1753–1804), Revolutionary-era statesman, U.S. Senator
 Frederick T. Frelinghuysen (1817–1885), U.S. Senator and Secretary of State
 Frederick Frelinghuysen (businessman) (1848–1924), president of the Mutual Benefit Life Insurance Company